Collesano (Sicilian: Culisanu) is a small town in the Metropolitan City of Palermo, Sicily.
It lies in the Madonie Park between the hills and the Tyrrhenian Sea and is also on the Targa Florio racing circuit since its beginning (1906). The town owns the official Targa Florio Museum.

History

The long history of Collesano relates to the history of original inhabitants of Sicily, the Sicani, people coming from Spain, and later to the town of Imera, the hometown of the poet Stesichoros, the old Greek town founded  by Chalcidians and destroyed by Hannibal[?] in 208 B.C.[212 - 210 more likely]. The Arab geographer al-Idrisi speaks of Collesano, which he described in "The Book of Roger".  He tells of the destruction of the town Qal'at as-Sirat situated on the top of Golden Mountain by the Norman king Ruggero II. Afterwards the town was rebuilt and was called Bagherino. In the Middle Ages, the name was changed to Golisano and then to Collesano. Many aristocratic families have been involved in the governance of the town, such as the countess Adelicia de Alife, niece of the Norman king Roger II of Sicily; the count of Avenel; the Ventimiglia's; the Cicala's; the Centelle's; the de Folch Cardona; the Aragona; the  Moncada's; and the Ferrandina's. Monuments to visit include: the ruins of the Norman castle; the old ceramic manufactory; the Cathedral of St. Peter; the churches of St. Mary "the Old", St. James, St. Sebastian and Fabian, St. Dominic or St. Mary "the New", and of St. Mary of Jesus; the Pedaly's Abbey and the Targa Florio Museum which many old-time car clubs stop at during their event on the Madonie Circuit.           
Collesano is also famous for its ceramic artwork and the Mystery Plays: "la Cercha", a procession with the Penitentes organized every year in Holy Week; and "la Casazza", the "Cycle of Collesano" that has been presented five times in the last century.

International relations

Twin towns – Sister cities
Collesano is twinned with:
 Yverdon-les-Bains, Switzerland

Sources

External links
Collesano details 

Bibliography: Settimana Santa in Sicilia - La Cercha di Collesano -ISBN... by Kaori Sakurada-Giuseppe Valenza - Qanat publishing (Palermo)

Municipalities of the Metropolitan City of Palermo